The twenty-third cycle of America's Next Top Model premiered on December 12, 2016 on VH1. It was the first cycle to air on the network following the series cancellation by The CW. As opposed to the past three cycles, this cycle followed the series' original format of an all-female contest.

The cycle was presented by British singer Rita Ora, who took over from former model and businesswoman Tyra Banks. The judging panel was fully revamped, consisting of model Ashley Graham, Paper magazine chief creative officer Drew Elliott, and celebrity stylist Law Roach, replacing the previous panel consisting of Banks, fashion publicist Kelly Cutrone, and runway coach J. Alexander. Banks still served as the series' executive producer.

The winner of the competition was 20 year-old India Gants from Seattle, Washington with Tatiana Price placing as the runner up.

Prizes 
 A fashion spread in Paper magazine.
 A talent contract with VH1.
 A contract with Rimmel London cosmetics.
 A cash prize of US$100,000

The following prizes were removed:
 A modeling contract with NEXT Model Management 
 A spread in Nylon magazine.

Contestants 
(Ages stated are at start of contest.)

Episodes

Summaries

Call-out order 

 The contestant was eliminated
 The contestant won the competition

Bottom two

 The contestant was eliminated after their first time in the bottom two
 The contestant was eliminated after their second time in the bottom two
 The contestant was eliminated after their third time in the bottom two
 The contestant was eliminated after their fourth time in the bottom two
 The contestant was eliminated in the final judging and placed third
 The contestant was eliminated in the final judging and placed as the runner-up

Average call-out order

Casting call-out order, comeback first call-out and final episode are not included.

Photo shoot guide 
Episode 1 photo shoot: Comp cards (casting)
Episode 2 photo shoot: Crowd surfing 
Episode 3 photo shoot: Nude in groups
Episode 4 photo shoot: Social media stories for Paper magazine
Episode 5 photo shoot: Avant-garde designs in a supermarket 
Episode 6 photo shoot: Sports club with Chanel Iman
Episode 7 video shoot: Gypsy sport fashion in Harlem 
Episode 8 photo shoot: Luxury jet-setters with Jason Derulo
Episode 9 video shoot: Dance battles with French Montana
Episode 10 photo shoot: Celebrity impersonations
Episode 11 photo shoot: Paper magazine mock covers
Episode 12 beauty video: Beauty transformations with face painting
Episode 14 commercial: Rimmel in the streets of London
Episode 15 photo shoot: Paper magazine editorial spread

Makeovers

 Cherish – Dyed fire-engine red
 Giah – Blonde shoulder-length bob
 Krislian – Straightened with bangs
 Kyle – Two-tone pompadour
 Binta – No makeover
 Marissa – Relaxed with added volume
 Paige – Shoulder length cut with blunt bangs
 Tash – High-top fade
 Cody – Long blonde ombre weave
 Courtney – Marilyn Monroe inspired cut
 Cory Anne – Long chestnut curls
 Tatiana – Long wavy weave
 India – Dyed lavender and pink

References

External links 
 

America's Next Top Model
2016 American television seasons
2017 American television seasons
Television shows filmed in New York (state)